Peter Wright (born 30 December 1967) is a former rugby union footballer and now coach.

Rugby Union career

Amateur career

He played for Lasswade RFC and Boroughmuir.

Provincial and professional career

He played for Edinburgh District; and on professionalism in Scotland, played for Edinburgh Rugby and then Border Reivers.

International career

He was capped by Scotland B once, on 18 February 1989 against France 'B'.

He won 21 caps at prop for Scotland between 1992 and 1996, and toured New Zealand with the British and Irish Lions in 1993.

Coaching career

He now coaches Glasgow High Kelvinside. He previously coached the Glasgow Hawks.

In the 2004–05 season Wright coached Hawks to a BT League and Cup double, beating Dundee HSFP 29–17 in the cup final on the international pitch at Murrayfield. He is also a Scottish Rugby development officer in Dumfries and Galloway. Wright started his coaching at Murrayfield Wanderers, leading them to the SRU Bowl in 2000, before joining Hawks.

On BBC Radio Scotland, Wright said of Scottish players that, "If you tell them six times that they are no good they will believe you, but you have to tell them a million times that they are good to get the same result."

References

External links
Under-19s' build-up worries Wright - The Scotsman, 25 March 2006

1967 births
Living people
Scottish rugby union players
Scotland international rugby union players
Scottish rugby union coaches
British & Irish Lions rugby union players from Scotland
Boroughmuir RFC players
Rugby union players from Midlothian
Lasswade RFC players
Scotland 'B' international rugby union players